Robb Moss is an independent documentary filmmaker and Chair of the Department of Visual and Environmental Studies at Harvard University.

Notable works by Moss include such films as Containment, The Same River Twice, Secrecy, and The Tourist. His films are often about the passage of time and its effect on characters, stories, and memories. His films have screened at various festivals.

Robb Moss's most recent project, Containment, is about the disposition of nuclear waste for now and for the next 10,000 years. Co-directed with Peter Galison, the film premiered at Full Frame in 2015.

Secrecy and The Same River Twice premiered at the Sundance Film Festival.

Moss has taught filmmaking at Harvard for the past 25 years.

References 

American documentary filmmakers
Living people
Year of birth missing (living people)